Giant's Grave are two standing stones at the foot of Black Combe in Cumbria, England. The smaller stone has three cup and ring marks whilst the taller has only one. The grave is accessible via the A595 road in a field near the level crossing.

Notes

Megalithic monuments in England
Buildings and structures in Cumbria
Tourist attractions in Cumbria
Archaeological sites in Cumbria
Whicham